Columbia County Airport  is a county-owned public use airport in Columbia County, New York, United States. The airport is located four nautical miles (7 km) northeast of the central business district of Hudson, New York. It is a small un-towered general aviation airport in the Hudson Valley.

Facilities and aircraft 
It has one asphalt paved runway designated 3/21 which measures 5,350 by 100 feet (1,631 x 30 m).

Final approach for runway 21 is directly over a golf course immediately to the north, and pilots should take caution on arrival and departure to avoid golfers. There has been at least one incident of a golfer intentionally hitting a landing aircraft with a golf ball. Departure path for runway 3 takes the pilot over homes. Pilots should be mindful of noise, especially at night. There is a police shooting range approximately 1 mile to the east, so gunshot sounds are not uncommon.

For the 12-month period ending June 29, 2007, the airport had 19,200 aircraft operations, an average of 52 per day: 78% general aviation, 21% air taxi and 1% military. At that time there were 32 aircraft based at this airport: 81% single-engine, 16% multi-engine and 3% jet.

Richmor Aviation operates out of the Columbia County Airport as the FBO providing fuel, tie-down, hangar, aircraft management, charter & maintenance.

References

External links 
 Google Maps''
 SkyVector Aerial Views (2016)
 
 

Airports in New York (state)
Transportation buildings and structures in Columbia County, New York